Juba Arabic, also known since 2011 as South Sudanese Arabic, is a lingua franca spoken mainly in Equatoria Province in South Sudan, and derives its name from the South Sudanese capital, Juba. It is also spoken among communities of people from South Sudan living in towns in Sudan. The pidgin developed in the 19th century, among descendants of Sudanese soldiers, many of whom were recruited from southern Sudan. Residents of other large towns in South Sudan, notably Malakal and Wau, do not generally speak Juba Arabic, tending towards the use of Arabic closer to Sudanese Arabic, in addition to local languages. Reportedly, it is the most spoken language in South Sudan (more so than the official language English) despite government attempts to discourage its use due to its association with past Arab colonization.

Classification
Juba derives from a pidgin based on Sudanese Arabic. It has a vastly simplified grammar as well as the influence of local languages from the south of the country. DeCamp, writing in the mid-1970s, classifies Juba Arabic as a pidgin rather than a creole language (meaning that it is not passed on by parents to their children as a first language), though Mahmud, writing slightly later, appears to equivocate on this issue (see references below). Mahmoud's work is politically significant as it represented the first recognition by a northern Sudanese intellectual that Juba Arabic was not merely "Arabic spoken badly" but is a distinct dialect.

Because of the civil war in southern Sudan from 1983, more recent research on this issue has been restricted. However, the growth in the size of Juba town since the beginning of the civil war, its relative isolation from much of its hinterland during this time, together with the relative collapse of state-run education systems in the government held garrison town (that would have further encouraged the use of Arabic as opposed to Juba Arabic), may have changed patterns of usage and transmission of Juba Arabic since the time of the last available research. Further research is required to determine the extent to which Juba Arabic may now be considered a creole rather than a pidgin language.

Phonology

Vowels
Each vowel in Juba Arabic comes in more open/more close pairs. It is more open in two environments: stressed syllables preceding , and unstressed syllables.

As opposed to Standard Arabic, Juba Arabic makes no distinction between short and long vowels. However, long vowels in Standard Arabic often become stressed in Juba Arabic. Stress can be grammatical, such as in   "to give birth", and   "to be born".

Consonants

Juba Arabic omits some of the consonants found in Standard Arabic. In particular, Juba Arabic makes no distinction between pairs of plain and emphatic consonants (e.g.   and  ), keeping only the plain variant. Moreover,   is never pronounced, while   and   may be pronounced  or omitted altogether. Conversely, Juba Arabic uses consonants not found in Standard Arabic: v ,  ny , and ng . Compare Standard Arabic   and Juba Arabic , meaning "sugar".

In the following table, the common Latin transcriptions appear between angle brackets next to the phonemes. Parentheses indicate phonemes that are either relatively rare or are more likely to be used in the "educated" register of Juba Arabic.

Orthography

Juba Arabic has no standardised orthography, but the Latin alphabet is widely used. A dictionary was published in 2005, Kamuus ta Arabi Juba wa Ingliizi, using the Latin script.

See also

Languages of South Sudan
Varieties of Arabic
Sudanese Arabic
Bimbashi Arabic

References

Bibliography

 Manfredi, Stefano, and Mauro Tosco. "Juba Arabic (ÁRABI JÚBA): A ‘less indigenous’ language of South Sudan." Sociolinguistic Studies 12, no. 2 (2018): 209-230.
 Leonardi, Cherry. "South Sudanese Arabic and the negotiation of the local state, c. 1840–2011." The Journal of African History 54, no. 3 (2013): 351-372.
 Miller, Catherine. "Southern Sudanese Arabic and the churches." Revue roumaine de linguistique 3 (2010): 383-400

Other Readings
 Manfredi, Stefano  "Juba Arabic: A Grammatical Description of Juba Arabic with Sociolinguistic notes about the Sudanese community in Cairo", Università degli Studi di Napoli "L'Orientale". (unpublished thesis)
 Miller, Catherine, 1983, "Le Juba-Arabic, une lingua-franca du Sudan méridional; remarques sur le fonctionnment du verbe", Cahiers du Mas-Gelles, 1, Paris, Geuthner, pp 105–118.
 Miller, Catherine, 1983, "Aperçu du système verbal en Juba-Arabic", Comptes rendu du GLECS, XXIV–XXVIII,  1979–1984, T. 2, Paris, Geuthner, pp 295–315.
 Watson, Richard L., (1989), "An Introduction to Juba Arabic", Occasional Papers in the Study of Sudanese Languages, 6: 95-117.

External links
Juba Arabic English Dictionary: Kamuus ta Arabi Juba wa Ingliizi
Juba Arabic Swadesh list
Podcasts in Juba Arabic
Juba-Arabic-Verbs-and-Phrases
Juba Arabic Facebook page
Juba Arabic for Beginners (Chapter 1) by the South Sudan Humanitarian Project

Arabic-based pidgins and creoles
Arab diaspora in Africa
Equatoria
Juba
Languages of South Sudan